Tingvalla Idrottsplats, Tingvalla IP, is a stadium in Karlstad, Sweden and is the home ground of the football team Carlstad United and the American football team Carlstad Crusaders. It is also used for athletic events and other sports and gatherings.

Built in 1919, it has a capacity of 10,000 (of which only 1,100 are seated). The attendance record was set on 24 August 2000, when 10,421 spectators saw Carlstad United play S.S. Lazio.

As the football club Karlstad BK (KBK) is about to play its matches in Division 2 (4th highest level) on Tingvalla IP, the municipality decided in 2010 to make a small renovation of the facility, including a new stand for 250 persons, a new match clock and new fences.

References

Football venues in Sweden
Swedish Bandy Final venues
American football venues in Sweden
Sport in Karlstad
1995 FIFA Women's World Cup stadiums